Dendrolaelaps sellnicki is a species of mite in the family Digamasellidae.

References

Digamasellidae
Articles created by Qbugbot
Animals described in 1960